Events from the year 1838 in France.

Incumbents
 Monarch – Louis Philippe I

Events
27 November - Pastry War begins when the French fleet begins a blockade and attack on Mexico in support of a claim for supposed damages owing to a French pastry cook from earlier unrest in the country.
Badoit mineral water from Saint-Galmier is first bottled.

Births
4 March - Paul Lacôme, composer (died 1920)
2 April - Léon Gambetta, statesman (died 1882)
20 May - Jules Méline, statesman, Prime Minister (died 1925)
25 October - Georges Bizet, composer and pianist (died 1875)
7 November - Auguste Villiers de l'Isle-Adam, writer (died 1889)
31 December - Émile Loubet, politician and 7th President of France (died 1929)

Deaths
21 February - Silvestre de Sacy, linguist and orientalist (born 1758)
28 February - Charles Thévenin, painter (born 1764)
17 May - Charles Maurice de Talleyrand-Périgord, politician and diplomat (born 1754)
29 September - Pierre-Dominique Bazaine, scientist and engineer (born 1786)
8 October - Prosper Garnot, surgeon and naturalist (born 1794)
21 November - Georges Mouton, Marshal of France and political figure (born 1770)
20 December - Hégésippe Moreau, poet (born 1810)

References

1830s in France